Sinnada was an ancient city in Mauretania Caesariensis.

Its location is presumed near Kenada, in modern Algeria.

Ecclesiastical history 
Sinnada was a suffragan bishopric of the metropolitan see of Caesarea Mauretaniae, but later faded.

Titular see 
The diocese was nominally restored in 1933 as a Latin Catholic titular bishopric. 

It has had three incumbents of the lowest (episcopal) rank and one of the intermediary (archiepiscopal) rank.

References

External links 
 GigaCatholic with titular incumbent biography links

Catholic titular sees in Africa
Former dioceses in Africa
Mauretania Caesariensis